Scrobipalpa fusca is a moth in the family Gelechiidae. It was described by Oleksiy V. Bidzilya and Hou-Hun Li in 2010. It is found in China (Xinjiang), Mongolia, Uzbekistan, Turkmenistan and south-eastern Kazakhstan.

The forewings are covered with light-grey, brown or ochreous-tipped scales, sparsely mottled dark. The hindwings are grey. Adults are on wing from the end of April to July.

Etymology
The species name refers to the uniform brown forewings and is derived from Latin fuscus (meaning dark, brown).

References

Scrobipalpa
Moths described in 2010